Marcel Blistène, born Marcel Blitstein (3 June 1911 in Paris – 2 August 1991), was a French film director.

Marcel Blistène joined Paramount in 1930 as an assistant, after studying literature. He then began a career as a film journalist, for Pour vous and Cinémonde.

He made his first movie Étoile sans lumière in 1945, and in the thirteen years that followed, he only directed ten more motion pictures.

Filmography
Director
 Les Amants de demain (1959)
 Sylviane de mes nuits (1957)
 Gueule d'ange (1955)
 Fire Under Her Skin (1954)
 This Age Without Pity (1952)
 Bibi Fricotin (1951)
 Le Sorcier du ciel (1949)
 Night Express (1948)
 Back Streets of Paris (1946)
 Star Without Light (1946)

Writer	
 Sylviane de mes nuits (1957)
 Gueule d'ange (1955)
 Fire Under Her Skin (1954)
 Star Without Light (1946)

Producer
 Sylviane de mes nuits (1957)

External links
 

1911 births
1991 deaths
Film directors from Paris